The boys' 55 kg  competition in taekwondo at the 2010 Summer Youth Olympics in Singapore took place on August 16. A total of 12 men competed in this event, limited to fighters whose body weight was less than 55 kilograms. Preliminaries started at 15:04, quarterfinals started at 17:00, semifinals at 19:02 and the final at 20:09. Two bronze medals were awarded at the Taekwondo competitions.

Medalists

Results
Legend
PTG — Won by Points Gap
SUP — Won by Superiority
OT — Won on over time (Golden Point)

Main bracket

References
 Draw

Taekwondo at the 2010 Summer Youth Olympics